The Commerce City School District is a public school district in Jackson County, Georgia, based in the city of Commerce. It serves Commerce and the surrounding communities in Jackson County.

Schools
The Commerce City School District has two elementary schools, one middle school, and one high school.

Elementary schools
Commerce Elementary School
Commerce Primary School

Middle school
Commerce Middle School

High school
Commerce High School

References

External links

School districts in Georgia (U.S. state)
Education in Jackson County, Georgia